Arxel Tribe is a video game and multimedia company, founded by Slovene architects Matjaž Požlep and Diego Zanco in 1991.

Games
The games developed or published by Arxel Tribe include:

 Faust (also released as Seven Games of the Soul), 1999, (Adventure game) -- (Cryo)
 Jerusalem: The Three Roads to the Holy Land, 2002, (Adventure game, Educational) -- (Cryo)
 The Paulo Coelho trilogy:
 Pilgrim: Faith as a Weapon, 1997, (Adventure game) -- (Infogrames Entertainment)
 The Legend of the Prophet and the Assassin, 2000, (Adventure game) -- AT
 The Secrets of Alamut, 2001, (Adventure game) -- AT
 The Ring: The Legend of the Nibelungen, 1998, (Adventure game) -- (Cryo)
 Ring II: Twilight of the Gods, 2002, (TPS, Adventure game) -- AT
 Casanova: The Duel of the Black Rose, 2001 (TPS, Adventure game) -- AT
 Hannibal - the Game, 2003, (TPS, Adventure game) -- AT / (NEVER PUBLISHED)
 Mistmare, 2003, (RPG) -- AT
 The Gladiators: Galactic Circus Games, 2002, (TPS, Strategy) -- AT
 Trainz, 2002, (Simulation) -- AT
 Disciples 2, 2002, -- AT
 Hitchcock: The Final Cut, 2001, (Adventure game) -- AT/Ubisoft
 Louvre: The Final Curse, 2000, -- (Index+)
 Pompei, 2000, -- (RMN)
 Nounours / Big Teddy, 2000, -- AT
 Adada, 2001, -- AT
 Paddington Bear, 2001, -- (TLC)
 Primitive Wars, 2001, -- AT
 Dreamstreet, 2002, -- (Mindscape)

References

External links
 Arxel Tribe web page (archived)

Companies established in 2000
Video game development companies
Video game publishers
Video game companies of Slovenia